The Valdostan regional election of 1978 took place on 25 June 1978.

The council was divided in a dozen of parties, with consequent political instability under the leadership of the Valdostan Union.

Results

Sources: Regional Council of Aosta Valley and Istituto Cattaneo

Elections in Aosta Valley
1978 elections in Italy
June 1978 events in Europe